Irvin "Bo" Roberson (July 23, 1935 – April 15, 2001) was an American track and field athlete and football player.  At Cornell University he excelled in basketball, football, and track and field. At the 1960 Summer Olympics in Rome, Italy he won the silver medal in the long jump, a centimeter short of the Olympic record 8.12 m gold medal jump by Ralph Boston.

After the Olympics, Roberson had a seven-year Pro Football career as a wide receiver in the American Football League with the San Diego Chargers, Oakland Raiders, Buffalo Bills, and Miami Dolphins.  He caught three passes for eighty-eight yards in the Bills' 23–0 defeat of the Chargers in the 1965 American Football League Championship Game.  Roberson led the league in all purpose yards in 1964, and was named to the AFL All-Star Game in 1965.

After his NFL career was over, Roberson became the first track and field coach at University of California, Irvine and later coached track at Rolling Hills High School.

Roberson is the only person to have an Ivy League degree, a Ph.D., an Olympic medal and a career in the NFL.

At the time of his death, he was retired from a position as psychologist with the Los Angeles Unified School District.

See also

References

External links
 

1935 births
2001 deaths
American male long jumpers
American football wide receivers
Oakland Raiders players
Buffalo Bills players
Cornell Big Red men's basketball players
Cornell Big Red football players
Cornell Big Red men's track and field athletes
Miami Dolphins players
San Diego Chargers players
American Football League All-Star players
Athletes (track and field) at the 1959 Pan American Games
Athletes (track and field) at the 1960 Summer Olympics
Medalists at the 1960 Summer Olympics
Olympic silver medalists for the United States in track and field
Pan American Games gold medalists for the United States
Sportspeople from Philadelphia
Players of American football from Philadelphia
African-American players of American football
African-American male track and field athletes
Pan American Games medalists in athletics (track and field)
American Football League players
UC Irvine Anteaters track and field coaches
American men's basketball players
Track and field athletes in the National Football League
Track and field athletes from Philadelphia
Medalists at the 1959 Pan American Games
20th-century African-American sportspeople